Gayratjon Hasanov (born 12 January 1983 in Qarshi, Uzbek SSR, Soviet Union) is Uzbek footballer who plays as a goalkeeper for Nasaf Qarshi. He is a member of Uzbekistan national football team.

References

External links
  Profile

1983 births
Living people
Uzbekistani footballers
Uzbekistan international footballers
2007 AFC Asian Cup players

Association football goalkeepers